Kaiaua is a small coastal settlement on the Seabird Coast, on the western shore of the Firth of Thames, in the Hauraki District and Waikato region of New Zealand's North Island. It is 80km (60 minutes drive) from Auckland.

Name
The name of the settlement is of Māori origin, meaning "Eating mullets" (kai: to eat; aua: mullet or herrings) 
relating to the good fishing grounds in the area. Kaiaua was known as 'New Brighton' by the early settlers but the name was changed to Kaiaua in 1897.

History 
The township of Kaiaua is located upon a larger block of land called Ōpita. This block commences at the foreshore in front of the Kaiaua settlement and reaches inland to a point called Ōpita, the elevated inland area behind Kaiaua township (on the road to Mangatangi). The Ōpita block was first investigated by the Native Land Court in 1869 following an application by Hamiora Te Rangituaatea of Ngāti Paoa in 1868. A certificate of title was subsequently awarded to Te Rangituaatea and others of Ngāti Paoa.

During the 1870s, the block was sold to two brothers: Thomas Edmund Smith and William Alfred Smith. Following this sale, the establishment of Kaiaua township began. By 1885, various survey plans show a hotel, a race course and other amenities. By 1888, a small school had been established.

The sale of the Ōpita block included an agreement to set aside and protect a ’burial ground’ near the mouth of the Hauārahi stream. Unfortunately, this agreement was not observed as the burial ground was included in the Ōpita block and in later land transactions. This prompted approaches by Pōkaitara Wikiriwhi of Ngāti Paoa to the Native Minister in the 1930s seeking protection.

Tourism
The Hauraki Rail Trail officially starts at Kaiaua and traces the coastline south along the Firth of Thames, over chenier shell banks and through wetlands of international significance. It is one of the Great Rides of the New Zealand Cycle Trail system  The route incorporates a coastal bird watching area and Miranda Hot Springs.

The area is popular with campers and there is a designated freedom camping area just north of the Kaiaua village.

A boat-ramp is also available for fishing enthusiasts.

Notable features 

The Torea Mangu Oystercatcher sculpture is the world's largest sculpture of an oystercatcher. It stands between the Pink Shop Seaside Store  and  Kaiaua School. Over 4 metres long and 3.5 metres tall, the 2.5 ton bird is constructed of ferro-cement. The sculpture is by local artist Tony Johnston and represents the mother of all oystercatchers. In Māori 'torea mangu' means black oystercatcher. Erected facing north east, the direction of prevailing winds, the sculpture symbolises the wildlife of The Firth of Thames.

Demographics
It is part of the wider Miranda-Pūkorokoro statistical area.

Kaiaua had a population of 429 at the 2018 New Zealand census, an increase of 18 people (4.4%) since the 2013 census, and an increase of 90 people (26.5%) since the 2006 census. There were 183 households, comprising 216 males and 210 females, giving a sex ratio of 1.03 males per female, with 66 people (15.4%) aged under 15 years, 30 (7.0%) aged 15 to 29, 192 (44.8%) aged 30 to 64, and 138 (32.2%) aged 65 or older.

Ethnicities were 82.5% European/Pākehā, 35.0% Māori, 0.7% Pacific peoples, and 0.7% Asian. People may identify with more than one ethnicity.

Although some people chose not to answer the census's question about religious affiliation, 55.9% had no religion, 30.8% were Christian, 2.1% had Māori religious beliefs and 0.7% had other religions.

Of those at least 15 years old, 33 (9.1%) people had a bachelor's or higher degree, and 108 (29.8%) people had no formal qualifications. 42 people (11.6%) earned over $70,000 compared to 17.2% nationally. The employment status of those at least 15 was that 144 (39.7%) people were employed full-time, 51 (14.0%) were part-time, and 9 (2.5%) were unemployed.

Education
Kaiaua School was first established in 1883.

The EcoQuest Education Foundation is a Private Training Establishment established in 1999. It provides residential courses for US students through a partnership with the University of New Hampshire in the United States of America. Its campus is located in Whakatīwai.

Māori 

Kaiaua is located within the traditional homelands of the iwi (tribe) called Ngāti Paoa. They maintain a marae (tribal centre including a carved meeting house) called Wharekawa at Whakatīwai. This is shared with the closely related people of Ngāti Whanaunga whose lands are located to the north of Kaiaua.

Māori settlement has been continuous and unbroken in the Kaiaua area and coast for over 600 years. The ocean going ancestral vessel called Tainui travelled from central Polynesia and landed at Waihīhī, north of Kaiaua, in approximately 1350AD. Tainui peoples have lived in the area since that time leading to the presence of Ngāti Paoa and Ngāti Whanaunga today (both Tainui tribes).

Notable pā (traditional villages) of the district include Tikiore on the Whakatīwai stream, Hauārahi in Kaiaua itself and Rangipō to the south of Kaiaua. There are many more.

Other sites of significance include the Tauwhare Koiora reserve at the mouth of the Hauārahi stream and numerous urupā (cemeteries) located along the coast both on low lying sites adjacent to the sea (such as the Whakatīwai urupā) and on inland, elevated areas.

References

External links
Photos of Kaiaua

Hauraki District
Populated places in Waikato
Populated places around the Firth of Thames